are Canadian citizens of Japanese ancestry. Japanese Canadians are mostly concentrated in Western Canada, especially in the province of British Columbia, which hosts the largest Japanese community in the country with the majority of them living in and around Vancouver. In 2016, there were 121,485 Japanese Canadians throughout Canada.

Generations 
The term Nikkei (日系) was coined by sociologists and encompasses all of the world's Japanese immigrants across generations. Japanese descendants living overseas have special names for each of their generations. These are formed by combining one of the Japanese numerals with the Japanese word for generation (sei, 世):
Issei (一世) – The first generation of immigrants, born in Japan before moving to Canada.
Nisei (二世) – The second generation, born in Canada to Issei parents not born in Canada.
Sansei (三世) – The third generation, born in Canada to Nisei parents born in Canada.
Yonsei (四世) – The fourth generation, born in Canada to Sansei parents born in Canada.
Gosei (五世) – The fifth generation, born in Canada to Yonsei parents born in Canada.

History

Early years
The first Japanese settler in Canada was Manzo Nagano, who lived in Victoria, British Columbia in 1877 (a mountain in the province was named after him in 1977). The first generation or Issei, mostly came to Vancouver Island, the Fraser Valley and Rivers Inlet from fishing villages on the islands of Kyūshū and Honshū between 1877 and 1928.  A Japanese community newspaper for Vancouver residents was first launched in 1897. Around the same time, the Fraser River Japanese Fishermen’s Association Hospital in Steveston was established after the local hospital refused to admit and treat Japanese immigrants.

In 1907, the Asiatic Exclusion League was established in Vancouver and, by September of that year, led a mob of rioters who vandalized both Chinese and Japanese neighbourhoods. In 1908, Canada enacted a Gentlemen's Agreement intended to curb further Japanese immigration to Canada.

Influenced by the American Immigration Act of 1924, members of the British Columbia parliament pushed for a total federal ban on immigration in the 1920s. After several years of negotiations, Japan eventually agreed to reduce its immigration quota under the Gentleman's Agreement to only 150 persons per year.

Internment

In 1942, the Canadian government used the War Measures Act to brand Japanese-Canadians enemy aliens and to categorize them as security threats. There were 20,881 Japanese placed in internment camps and road camps in British Columbia, and prisoner-of-war camps in Ontario. Families were also sent as forced labourers to farms throughout the prairies. Three quarters of them were already citizens in Canada. A parallel situation occurred in the United States, the Japanese American internment.

The property and homes of Japanese Canadians living in the province of British Columbia were seized and sold off without their consent in 1943. The funds were used to pay for their internment. They also had to "pay rent" for living in the internment shacks that they were assigned. In 1945, after the war, as part of the continued effort to remove all Japanese Canadians from British Columbia, Prime Minister William Lyon MacKenzie King had his cabinet pass Orders-in-Council to extend the powers of the War Measures Act and give Japanese Canadians two "options": to be relocated to another province "East of the Rockies" or to go "back" to Japan though most were born in Canada and had never been to Japan. After organized protests by against their treatment, they were finally given the right to vote in 1949. Mobility restrictions were lifted in 1949.

After World War II
Until 1948, Japanese-Canadians, both Issei and Canadian-born Nisei, were denied the right to vote. Those born in the 1950s and 1960s in Canada are mostly Sansei, the third generation. Sansei usually have little knowledge of the Japanese language. Over 75% of the Sansei have married non-Japanese. Nisei and Sansei generally identify themselves not as fully Japanese but as Canadians first who happen to have Japanese ancestry.

Since 1967, the second wave of immigrants were usually highly educated and resided in urban areas.

In the late 1970s and the 1980s, documents on the Japanese Canadian internment were released, and redress was sought by the National Association of Japanese Canadians, an organization representing Japanese Canadians nationally that was headed by Art Miki from Winnipeg. In 1986, it was shown that Japanese Canadians had lost $443 million during the internment. There were 63% of Canadians who supported redress and 45% who favoured individual compensation. On September 22, 1988, the National Association of Japanese Canadians succeeded in negotiating a redress settlement with the government at the time, under the leadership of Prime Minister Brian Mulroney. The settlement included $21,000 for each individual directly affected, which was by 1993 almost 18,000 survivors. The federal government also provided a community endowment fund to assist in rebuilding the community, which is run by the National Association of Japanese Canadians. In addition, to address the more systemic racism that led to the plan and later justifications of the effort to remove "all people of Japanese racial origin" from Canadian territory, the redress settlement included the establishment of the Race Relations Foundation and challenges to the War Measures Act. The Prime Minister also offered a formal apology in the House of Commons and the certificate of acknowledgement of injustices of the past, which was sent to each Japanese Canadian whose rights had been stripped, incarcerated, dispossessed and forcibly displaced.

The younger generation of Japanese-Canadians born in the late 20th century are mostly Yonsei, the fourth generation. Many Yonsei are of mixed racial descent. According to Statistics Canada's 2001 census of population information, Japanese-Canadians were the Canadian visible minority group most likely to have a formal or common-law marriage with a non-Japanese partner. Out of the 25,100 couples in Canada in 2001 that had at least one Japanese person, in only 30% of them were both partners of Japanese descent. As of 2001, 65% of Canada's Japanese population was born in Canada.

Education

Hoshū jugyō kō (Japanese supplementary schools) for instruction of the Japanese language include those in Calgary, Edmonton, Halifax, London, Montreal, Ottawa, Saskatoon, Toronto, and Vancouver.

With teachers from Japan:
 Toronto Japanese School
  - Established on April 7, 1973 (Showa Year 48).

Without teachers from Japan:
 Alberta
 Calgary Hoshuko Japanese School Association (カルガリー補習授業校 Karugarī Hoshū Jugyō Kō)
 Metro Edmonton Japanese Community School (MEJCS; エドモントン補習校 Edomonton Hoshūkō)
 Nova Scotia
 Japanese School of Halifax (ハリファックス補習授業校 Harifakkusu Hoshū Jugyō Kō)
 Ontario
 London (CA) Japanese School (ロンドン（ＣＡ）補習授業校 Rondon Hoshū Jugyō Kō)
 The Ottawa Hoshuko (オタワ補習校 Otawa Hoshūkō)
 Quebec
 Montreal Hoshuko School
 Saskatchewan
 Saskatoon Japanese Language School (サスカトーン補習授業校 Sasukatōn Hoshū Jugyō Kō)

Demographics

Japanese Canadians by province or territory 
Japanese Canadian population by province and territory in Canada in 2021 according to Statistics Canada:

Gallery

Notable people
{{columns-list|colwidth=30em|*

Academics
Audrey Kobayashi, social scientist
Yoshio Masui, cell biologist
Emi Nakamura, economist
Santa J. Ono, biologist
Irene Uchida, scientist and Down syndrome researcher
Noriko Yui, mathematician

Activists
Tomekichi Homma, voting rights activist
Art Miki, activist
Hide Hyodo Shimizu, educator and Japanese-Canadian civil rights activist
Setsuko Thurlow, anti-nuclear and peace activist

Architects
Bruce Kuwabara, architect
Raymond Moriyama, architect

Athletes
David Akutagawa, karateka
 Noah Kenshin Browne, soccer player
Yuka Chokyu, para-badminton player
Christa Deguchi, judoka
Bill Hatanaka, football player
Shane Higashi, karateka
Nathan Hirayama, rugby player
Taro Hirose, ice hockey player
Kate Horne, curler
Martin Kariya, ice hockey player
Noriko Kariya, boxer
Paul Kariya, ice hockey player
Steve Kariya, ice hockey player
Yoshio Katsuta, judoka
Sarah Kawahara, figure skater
Jason Krog, ice hockey player
Jon Matsumoto, ice hockey player
Glenn Michibata, tennis player
Bryan Miki, curler
Keegan Messing, figure skater
Issey Nakajima-Farran, soccer player
Paris Nakajima-Farran, soccer player
Emily Nishikawa, cross-country skier
Kristy Odamura, softball player
Takemasa Okuyama, karateka
Stuart Percy, ice hockey player
Shigetaka Sasaki, judoka
Raymond Sawada, ice hockey player
Yoshio Senda, judoka
Devin Setoguchi, ice hockey player  
Masaru Shintani, karateka
Jamie Storr, ice hockey player
Vicky Sunohara, ice hockey player and coach
Nick Suzuki, ice hockey player
Ryan Suzuki, ice hockey player
Masao Takahashi, judoka and author
Phil Takahashi, judoka
Ray Takahashi, wrestler and judoka
Tina Takahashi, judoka
Atsuko Tanaka, ski jumper
Yuki Tsubota, freestyle skier
Masami Tsuruoka, karateka
Katie Tsuyuki, snowboarder
John Tucker, ice hockey player
Nyl Yakura, badminton player
Kimiko Zakreski, snowboarder

Film and broadcasting
Mio Adilman, actor, TV host and writer, Trailer Park Boys, The Strain
Nobu Adilman, actor, TV host and writer Trailer Park Boys, Food JammersDenis Akiyama, actor and voice actor, Johnny Mnemonic, Sailor Moon
Jeff Chiba Stearns, documentarian and animator, One Big Hapa FamilyBrian Clement, filmmaker, Meat Market, Binge & Purge
Severn Cullis-Suzuki, environmentalist, author and television host
Kazumi Evans, actress and voice actress, My Little Pony: Friendship is MagicJeananne Goossen, actress, Falcon Beach, Criminal MindsMary Ito, radio and television host
Robert Ito, actor, Quincy, M.E., Falcon CrestBrenda Kamino, actress, Carter
Hiro Kanagawa, actor, Smallville, The Man in the High Castle
Andrew Kishino, voice actor and rapper, The LeBrons, FortniteByron Lawson, actor, Snakes on a PlaneMargaret Lyons, former CBC vice president
Nobu McCarthy, actress, The Wash
Philip Nozuka, actor, Degrassi: The Next GenerationLinda Ohama, documentary filmmaker
Randall Okita, screenwriter and filmmaker, The LockpickerLauren Riihimaki, YouTuber
Tetsuro Shigematsu, filmmaker, playwright and radio broadcaster
Peter Shinkoda, actor, Falling Skies, Daredevil
Dylan Akio Smith, film and video game director, Man. Feel. Pain., FIFA
Jennifer Spence, actress, Stargate Universe, Continuum
Peter Stursberg, writer and broadcaster
Richard Stursberg, former CBC executive vice president
David Suzuki, environmentalist and documentarian, The Nature of ThingsMutsumi Takahashi, television news anchor
Lauren Toyota, television host
Mia Uyeda, model and VJ
Jai West, actor, Hazard, Big Bang Love, Juvenile ALisa Yamanaka, actress and voice actress, The Magic School Bus

Musicians
Kenji Fusé, violinist
Aristazabal Hawkes, double bassist, Guillemots
Ron Korb, flautist
Kytami, violinist
Catherine Manoukian, violinist
Mark Takeshi McGregor, flutist
George Nozuka, R&B singer
Justin Nozuka, singer-songwriter
Jon Kimura Parker, pianist
Alcvin Ramos, shakuhachi player
Tim Tamashiro, jazz singer and radio broadcaster
Diyet van Lieshout, folk singer
Christine Yoshikawa, pianist

Politicians and government officials
S. I. Hayakawa, former U.S. Senator for California
Bev Oda, former MP for Durham, cabinet minister
Thomas Shoyama, economist and civil servant, early proponent and designer of Medicare
David Tsubouchi, former MPP for Markham, cabinet minister
Naomi Yamamoto, former MLA, for North Vancouver-Lonsdale, cabinet minister

Visual artists
Roy Kiyooka, painter, photographer and multi-media artist
Nobuo Kubota, multi-media artist
Nina Matsumoto, comic book artist, Saturnalia
Takeshi Miyazawa, comic book artist, Mary Jane, Runaways
Betty Mochizuki, painter and printmaker
Cindy Mochizuki, multimedia artist
Tomori Nagamoto, visual artist and poet
Kazuo Nakamura, painter and sculptor
Matsubara Naoko, printmaker and painter
Haruko Okano, mixed-media artist
Tim Okamura, painter and graphic artist
Midi Onodera, video artist
Marjorie Pigott, painter
Jillian Tamaki, comic book artist, This One SummerMiyuki Tanobe, painter
Takao Tanabe, painter

Writers and authors
Ken Adachi, journalist
Hiromi Goto, writer, The Kappa ChildTamai Kobayashi, novelist and short story writer
Joy Kogawa, author, ObasanKyo Maclear, novelist and children's author
Roy Miki, poet and scholar
Kenzo Mori, journalist and newspaper publisher
Kim Moritsugu, novelist
Sachiko Murakami, poet
Norimitsu Onishi, journalist
Ruth Ozeki, novelist, My Year of Meats, All Over CreationMichelle Sagara, novelist
Kerri Sakamoto, novelist and screenwriter, Strawberry Fields
Mark Sakamoto, writer and lawyer
Aki Shimazaki, novelist and translator
Mariko Tamaki, graphic novelist, This One Summer, She-HulkGrace Eiko Thomson, curator and memoirist

Other
Dan Liu, fashion designer
Masumi Mitsui, World War I veteran
Masajiro Miyazaki, physician
Manzo Nagano, first recorded Japanese immigrant to Canada
Gordon Goichi Nakayama, Anglican priest
Rick Shiomi, playwright and director, Yellow Fever
Hidekazu Tojo, chef, inventor of the B.C. roll

}}

See also

 Jodo Shinshu Buddhist Temples of Canada
 Asian Canadians
 Japanese Canadians in British Columbia
 Japanese in Toronto
 Japanese Americans
 East Asian Canadians
 Judo in Canada
 Reference re Persons of Japanese Race
 The Vancouver Asahi, 2014 Japanese film described Asahi (baseball team)

References

Further reading
 Adachi, Ken. The enemy that never was: A history of the Japanese Canadians (McClelland & Stewart, 1976)
 Sunahara, Ann Gomer. The politics of racism: The uprooting of Japanese Canadians during the Second World War (James Lorimer & Co, 1981)
 Ward, W. Peter, The Japanese in Canada'' (Canadian Historical Association Booklets, 1982) online 21pp

External links
 Multicultural Canada website images in the BC Multicultural Photograph Collection and digitized issues of The New Canadian (Japanese-Canadian newspaper) and Tairiku Jiho (The Continental Times)
 Japanese Canadians Photograph Collection – A photo album from the UBC Library Digital Collections chronicling the treatment of Japanese Canadians in British Columbia during World War II
 Tairiku Nippō – Japanese-Canadian newspaper published between 1907 and 1941, and now digitized by the UBC Library Digital Collections

 
Ethnic groups in Canada
Asian Canadian
Canada–Japan relations
 
East Asian Canadian
es:Inmigración japonesa en Canadá